Henry Kendall may refer to:

People
Henry Edward Kendall (1776–1875), English Architect
Henry Edward Kendall Jr. (1805–1885), his son, also an architect
Henry Ernest Kendall (1864–1949), farmer, physician and Lieutenant Governor of Nova Scotia
Henry George Kendall (1874–1965), British sea captain
Henry H. Kendall, (1855–1943), American architect
Henry Kendall (actor) (1897–1962), British stage and film character actor
Henry Kendall (ornithologist) (1849–1934), Australian ornithologist
Henry Kendall (poet) (1839–1882), Australian poet
Henry P. Kendall (1878–1959), American industrialist, philanthropist, father of Henry Way Kendall
 Henry Kendall (urban planner) (1903-1983), British architect
Henry Way Kendall (1926–1999), American physicist and Nobel laureate

Places
Henry Kendall College, earlier name of what is now the University of Tulsa